Frederik "Freddie" Andersen (born 2 October 1989) is a Danish professional ice hockey goaltender for the Carolina Hurricanes of the National Hockey League (NHL). He previously played for the Anaheim Ducks and Toronto Maple Leafs.

Andersen was a member of Denmark's national team that competed at the 2010 IIHF World Championship. He was selected by the Hurricanes in the seventh round, 187th overall, of the 2010 NHL Entry Draft. Unable to come to terms with the Hurricanes, however, Andersen later re-entered the draft and was selected in the third round of the 2012 NHL Entry Draft, 87th overall, by the Ducks, with whom he spent the first few years of his NHL career.

Playing career

Europe
On 13 March 2010, while playing for Frederikshavn White Hawks in the Superisligaen, Andersen scored an empty net goal in the fourth quarter-final match against Rødovre Mighty Bulls. He nearly scored two nights before in the third match, but missed.

Andersen set a new Elitserien regular season club record for Frölunda HC with eight shutouts in 2011–12, surpassing Henrik Lundqvist's seven shutouts from the 2003–04 season. In addition to his shutouts, Andersen also led the Elitserien in goals against average (GAA) and save percentage, as well as receiving a nomination for the Elitserien Rookie of the Year award.

NHL

Anaheim Ducks
On 20 October 2013, shortly into the 2013–14 season, Andersen made his NHL debut for the Anaheim Ducks, replacing starting goaltender Jonas Hiller to start the second period. Taking over with a 3–1 Ducks deficit, he logged two shutout periods, earning him his first NHL win, a 6–3 victory over the Dallas Stars. With the trade of then-backup goaltender Viktor Fasth to the Edmonton Oilers on 4 March 2014, Andersen became the team's new full-time backup goaltender to Hiller after spending the majority of the season playing for Anaheim's American Hockey League (AHL) affiliate, the Norfolk Admirals.

On 16 April 2014, Andersen won his Stanley Cup playoff debut as Anaheim defeated the Dallas Stars 4–3 in Game 1 of the Western Conference Quarterfinals. Andersen made 32 saves, giving up three goals. He split time with both Jonas Hiller and John Gibson during the Ducks' run in the 2014 playoffs, which ultimately ended in the Western Conference Semifinals against the Los Angeles Kings, the eventual Stanley Cup champions.

The following year, in 2014–15, with Hiller departed via free agency to the Calgary Flames, Andersen and Gibson became the Ducks' goaltending duo. As the season progressed, however, Andersen assumed the starter's role by virtue of both his impressive goaltending play and injuries to Gibson that kept the latter out of the lineup. After recording his 30th win of the season on 3 March 2015, Andersen tied an NHL record as the fastest goaltender in history to reach 50 career wins. He reached the milestone in just 68 career games, tying the record set by the Montreal Canadiens' Bill Durnan on 16 December 1944. In the 2015 Stanley Cup Playoffs, Andersen led the Ducks to the Western Conference Finals with his strong play - the Ducks only lost one game in the first two rounds. After taking a three-to-two series lead, the Ducks lost the final two games of the series, including Game 7 on home ice. This marked the third straight season the Ducks had lost a series in Game 7 at home after leading the series three games to two. Andersen allowed four or more goals in each of the final four games of the series - the Ducks lost three of those four games and allowed 19 goals over that span.

Toronto Maple Leafs
On 20 June 2016, Andersen was traded to the Toronto Maple Leafs for the 30th overall pick in the 2016 NHL Entry Draft (used to select Sam Steel) and a second-round pick in the 2017 NHL Entry Draft (middle of Toronto, San Jose, or Ottawa picks - used to select Maxime Comtois). On the same day, the Leafs and Frederik Andersen agreed to terms on a five-year contract extension. After a slow start with the Leafs, Andersen found his game; he went 33–16–14 on the season with a 2.67 GAA, a .918 save percentage, and four shutouts, leading the Leafs to a playoff berth for the first time since the 2012–13 NHL season.

During the 2017–18 season, Andersen bested his career-high in wins on 28 March 2018, with his 36th win of the season in a game against the Florida Panthers. On the same day, he helped the Leafs set a new franchise record of 27 wins on home ice after beating the Panthers 4–3. In the following game on 30 March 2018, against the New York Islanders, Andersen recorded his 37th win of the season, tying the single-season record for most wins by a Leafs goalie. On 7 April 2018, the last game of the Leafs' regular season, Andersen passed the Leafs all-time wins record with a 4–2 victory over the Montreal Canadiens. Andersen helped the Leafs qualify for the 2018 Stanley Cup playoffs, where they would fall to the Boston Bruins in seven games.

He recorded a 36–16–7 record during the 2018–19 NHL season, helping the Maple Leafs advance to their third consecutive playoff berth, but they were once again defeated in the first round by the Boston Bruins in seven games. On 14 December 2019, Andersen earned his 200th win in his 344th game against the Edmonton Oilers.

Carolina Hurricanes
At the conclusion of his five-year tenure with the Maple Leafs, Andersen left the club as a free agent. On 28 July 2021, he signed a two-year, $9 million contract with the Carolina Hurricanes. On 3 November, after a 6–3 win against the Chicago Blackhawks, Andersen became the first goaltender in franchise history to go 8–0–0 to start a season with a new team.

On 12 January 2022, Andersen was named to play in the 2022 NHL All-Star Game along with Sebastian Aho. On 5 February, Andersen who played the first half of the All-Star Game in both games against the Atlantic and Pacific, helped the Metropolitan Division win the contest. On 16 April, Andersen suffered an injury that involved him getting helped off the ice in the last few minutes of the game. The team ended up losing 7–4 to the Colorado Avalanche. He was not able to start games in the playoffs, making Antti Raanta and Pyotr Kochetkov starting the games. On 28 April, Andersen won the William M. Jennings Trophy trophy after Antti Raanta won 6–3 against the New Jersey Devils.

Personal life

Andersen comes from a family of ice hockey players. His father, Ernst, played seventeen season as a goaltender in the Metal Ligaen and is the current goaltending coach for Denmark men's national ice hockey team and Herning Blue Fox. His mother and uncles also played ice hockey in Denmark. His sister, Amalie, is a defenceman for the Danish women's national ice hockey team and is playing collegiately for Maine. His brother, Sebastian, is also a defenceman and represented Denmark in the men's national under-18 and junior ice hockey team. His brother, Valdemar, and cousin, Emma-Sofie Nordström, are also professional goaltenders.

Career statistics

Regular season and playoffs

Awards and honors

References

External links
 

1989 births
Living people
Anaheim Ducks draft picks
Anaheim Ducks players
Carolina Hurricanes draft picks
Carolina Hurricanes players
Danish expatriate sportspeople in Canada
Danish expatriate sportspeople in the United States
Danish ice hockey goaltenders
Expatriate ice hockey players in Canada
Expatriate ice hockey players in the United States
Frederikshavn White Hawks players
Frölunda HC players
Herning Blue Fox players
People from Herning Municipality
Norfolk Admirals players
Sportspeople from the Central Denmark Region
Toronto Maple Leafs players
Toronto Marlies players
William M. Jennings Trophy winners